The 1968 Wellington City mayoral election was part of the New Zealand local elections held that same year. In 1968, elections were held for the Mayor of Wellington plus other local government positions including fifteen city councillors. The polling was conducted using the standard first-past-the-post electoral method.

Background
Initially, long-serving councillor Denis McGrath announced his candidacy for Mayor on behalf of the Citizens' Association. He withdrew in June after he was appointed President of the New Zealand Law Society and decided not to seek re-election as a councillor either. This generated press speculation that the Citizens' Association would decide not field a candidate. However, despite previously declining to stand, deputy mayor Bob Archibald eventually accepted nomination following a deputation of local businessman requesting that he stand.

Ultimately, Frank Kitts was re-elected mayor for a fifth term. In doing so he won both a record size majority and became Wellington's longest-serving mayor.

Mayoralty results

Councillor results

References

Mayoral elections in Wellington
1968 elections in New Zealand
Politics of the Wellington Region
1960s in Wellington
October 1968 events in New Zealand